Moema is a genus of fish in the family Rivulidae. These annual killifish are mostly restricted to the Amazon basin in Bolivia, Brazil and Peru, but a few inhabit the upper Essequibo basin in Guyana, upper Orinoco basin in Venezuela and upper Paraguay basin in Brazil. They inhabit temporary waters, such as swamps or ponds, in primary forests. Once the water disappears, the adults die, but the eggs that have been laid in the bottom remain, only hatching after 3–10 months when the water returns. They rapidly reach adult size, but generally only live a few months after hatching, although captives (not subjected to disappearing water) can live longer.

Species
Moema was first described in 1989, having formerly been included in the Pterolebias. In 1998, it was suggested that several Moema species should be moved to their own genus, Aphyolebias. Some, including FishBase, continue to recognize both Moema and Aphyolebias. The distinction between them is not well-defined and genetic studies have shown that Moema is paraphyletic if not including Aphyolebias, leading several authorities such as Catalog of Fishes to consider the latter a junior synonym of former.

According to Fishbase, there are currently 11 recognized species in this genus:

 Moema apurinan W. J. E. M. Costa, 2004
 Moema beucheyi Valdesalici, D. T. B. Nielsen & Pillet, 2015
 Moema hellneri W. J. E. M. Costa, 2003
 Moema heterostigma W. J. E. M. Costa, 2003
 Moema nudifrontata W. J. E. M. Costa, 2003
 Moema ortegai W. J. E. M. Costa, 2003 
 Moema pepotei W. J. E. M. Costa, 1992
 Moema piriana W. J. E. M. Costa, 1989
 Moema portugali W. J. E. M. Costa, 1989
 Moema quiii Huber, 2003
 Moema staecki (Seegers, 1987)

References

Rivulidae
Freshwater fish genera